Schoenoplectus lacustris, the lakeshore bulrush or common club-rush, is a species of club-rush (genus Schoenoplectus) that grows in fresh water across Europe and some neighbouring areas.

Description

The stems of S. lacustris are round in cross-section, in contrast to the triquetrous (rounded-triangular) stems of other species in the genus, such as S. triqueter and S. pungens.

Distribution
Schoenoplectus lacustris is widespread in Europe, albeit rare in the far north, and extends eastwards into Asia as far as Mongolia. It is also found in a number of Mediterranean sites in North Africa, and has been introduced to Haiti.

Taxonomy
The species was first described by Carl Linnaeus as "Scirpus lacustris" in his 1753 . It became part of the genus Schoenoplectus when Eduard Palla raised this from the rank of subgenus to the rank of genus in 1888. Two subspecies are recognised; the autonymic subspecies (S. lacustris subsp. lacustris) is found throughout the range of the species, and a second, S. lacustris subsp. hippolyti is restricted to an area reaching from the Caucasus to the mountains of Central Asia.

References

lacustris
Plants described in 1753
Flora of Europe
Taxa named by Carl Linnaeus
Taxa named by Eduard Palla